Jose Gumbs (born April 20, 1988) is a former American football safety. He was signed by the New Orleans Saints as an undrafted free agent in 2012. He began playing football at Hebron Academy and later for Monmouth University at the collegiate level. He was also a member of the Kansas City Chiefs and Washington Redskins.

Professional career

New Orleans Saints
Gumbs signed with the New Orleans Saints after not being selected in the 2012 NFL Draft on April 30, 2012. The Saints released him on September 7.

Kansas City Chiefs
The Kansas City Chiefs signed Gumbs to their practice squad on December 5, 2012.

Washington Redskins
Gumbs was signed by the Washington Redskins on July 25, 2013. He made his NFL debut in Week 6 against the Dallas Cowboys. In his second career game, Gumbs made an explosive special teams tackle against the kick returner Eric Weems. He would have his first career start against the Denver Broncos in Week 8 with starting safeties Brandon Meriweather suspended and Reed Doughty out with a concussion. Gumbs made his first career interception against Atlanta Falcons quarterback Matt Ryan.

On March 3, 2014, the Redskins re-signed Gumbs to a one-year, $495,000 contract. He was released on May 17, 2014.

References

External links
 Monmouth Hawks bio
 Washington Redskins bio

1988 births
Living people
American football safeties
Monmouth Hawks football players
New Orleans Saints players
Kansas City Chiefs players
Washington Redskins players
Hebron Academy alumni